Rio Envira is a river in Acre state in Brazil. The Rio Jaminauá is one of its tributaries. It is a tributary of the Tarauacá River.

The river defines the northwest boundary of the  Santa Rosa do Purus National Forest, a sustainable use conservation unit created  in 2001.
It flows in a north of northeast direction from the park, passing under the BR-364 highway and flowing north into Amazonas state, where it joins the Tarauacá just south of the settlement of Envira.

See also
List of rivers of Acre

References

Rivers of Acre (state)